Jägala Army Base is a disused military base of the Estonian Defence Forces in Jägala village in Jõelähtme Parish, Harju County, Estonia. The base is located about 25 kilometres to the east of Tallinn.

History

During the Soviet era the location was a military base for Soviet armed forces. In 1992, the base was taken over by members of Kalev battalion from Soviet/Russian forces and it was the first military base that was taken over peacefully. Former masters were given 3 days to move out and take their clothing and food supplies with them. 
Between 1992 and 2002 this was used as an Estonia Kalevi Infantry Battalion base. After disbandment of this unit there were some Defence League units but the area was used not intensively. Some reserve refreshment courses took part in Jägala.

Plans

There is not enough space for development of Tallinn garrison military units. The condition of barracks and other buildings required investment. Training areas and shooting ranges are outside of the city. A decision was therefore made to relocate Guard, Logistics and other battalions from the city. The first plan which included development of Männiku training centre was postponed in 2006. After this a search was made to find a new area for Tallinn garrison units. Jägala met the requirements and was selected.

The Eesti Vabariigi Kaitseministeerium (Ministry of Defence) made a decision to build a new army base for Guard, Intelligence, Logistics and Staff and Signal Battalions. The Military Police and Northern Defence Command HQ would occupy old barracks of the Guard Battalion in Rahumäe. 
Construction of Jägala army base and renovation of Ämari Air base is the largest infrastructure projects in 2008–2018 Estonian army development plan. Investments in Jägala base project are expected not less than 96 mn. EURO. The Ground forces plan to complete bases in Jägala, Tapa Army Base, Paldiski, Jõhvi and Võru according to the mentioned plan. What is more Central Training Area is not far from here.

Criticism
Most part of the Guard Battalion ceremonial and other duties take part in the capital of Estonia. One more disadvantage is concentration of forces, equipment and materials. About one quarter of regular Estonian armed forces would be here.

Demolishing
In 2013, Jägala army base was demolished due to the fact that no modernisation was done and some buildings were potentially hazardous. It was conducted by the order of the defence minister Urmas Reinsalu and the chancellor, infrastructure department and defence force were informed. As per law, the local council should have given their approval, but this was not applied for before demolishing could start. This was cleared on a later date, but most of the base had been already demolished at the time.

See also 
Tallinn Higher Military-Political Construction School

References

Jõelähtme Parish
Military installations of Estonia
Buildings and structures in Harju County
Military installations of the Soviet Union